Foetal impairment(s) are  grounds for an abortion in New Zealand.

Foetal impairment is the existence of life-threatening or serious anatomical signs that will lead to either an impaired quality of life or at worst, lethal anatomical malformation which renders the foetus unable to survive outside a pregnant woman's body. It is one of several grounds contained within New Zealand's Contraception, Sterilisation and Abortion Act 1977, amended 1978, and Section 187A of the Crimes Act 1961.

Serious danger to the mental health of the woman is the grounds for 98–99% of abortions in New Zealand.

References

External links
Abortions, Statistics New Zealand

New Zealand abortion law